The Junkers Ju 60 was a  single engine airliner built in prototype form in Germany in the early 1930s. It was designed to meet a requirement issued by the Reichsverkehrsministerium (Reich Transport Ministry) for a German-built equivalent to the Lockheed Vega with which to equip Deutsche Luft Hansa. The result was a sleek, cantilever monoplane of conventional configuration, with wings skinned in the corrugated duralumin that had been a hallmark of Junkers designs up to this time, although this would be the last Junkers aircraft to have this feature. The main units of the tailwheel undercarriage were retractable.

The Ju 60 was evaluated by Deutsche Luft Hansa against the Heinkel He 70. With the latter able to demonstrate a top speed 75 km/h (47 mph) better than the Ju 60, development of the Junkers design was halted before the third prototype had been completed. The two examples that had already been constructed eventually saw service with the Luftwaffe as liaison aircraft until 1942. The work done on the design would later form the basis of the Ju 160.

Specifications

See also

References

 
 The Hugo Junkers Homepage
 Уголок неба

1930s German airliners
Ju 060
Single-engined tractor aircraft
Aircraft first flown in 1932